Henry George Platt was a footballer who played at left-back for Burslem Port Vale in the late 1890s.

Career
Platt joined Burslem Port Vale in the summer of 1896. He started off as a regular in the side, playing in 13 Midland League games before losing his place in February 1897. He also played in two Football League Second Division and seven cup games before getting released from the Athletic Ground at the end of the 1898–99 season.

Career statistics
Source:

References

Year of birth missing
Year of death missing
English footballers
Association football fullbacks
Port Vale F.C. players
Midland Football League players
English Football League players